Tunisia competed at the 2017 World Aquatics Championships in Budapest, Hungary from 14 to 30 July.

Open water swimming

Tunisia has entered one open water swimmer

Swimming

Tunisia received a Universality invitation from FINA to send two male swimmers to the World Championships.

References

Nations at the 2017 World Aquatics Championships
2017
World Aquatics Championships